Ari Boyland (born 10 August 1987) is a New Zealand stage and television actor.

Life and career
Known for his role as KC in Cloud 9's The Tribe. He was a cast member in Series 1–3, along with a brief appearance in Series 5, and whose character became somewhat of a protégé of Lex (Caleb Ross). Boyland also starred in The Tribe music video and album Abe Messiah and the documentary The Making of The Tribe in 1999 as well as the 2001 British documentary A Date With the Tribe.

While attending the New Zealand Children's Academy, he also had small roles in Cloud 9's Revelations - The Initial Journey and the Disney Channel Original Movie You Wish! as well as many theatrical and musical productions across New Zealand.

In August 2008, Boyland starred in the White Trash Omnibus, a play written and directed by Auckland University graduate Patrick Graham, with Kate Rylatt and Mike Ginn at the Maidment Theatre in Auckland, New Zealand. He also appeared in the South Pacific Pictures television series Go Girls, based on another play written by Patrick Graham. In 2009, he played the character of Flynn McAllistair in the children's television series Power Rangers RPM.

Boyland was born in Lower Hutt, New Zealand. He is Jewish. In 2021, he was announced as a cast member of the CBBC family-adventure series Mystic. In 2022, he appeared in three episodes of the TVNZ sitcom Kid Sister.

Filmography

Television

Film

Awards

At the 2014 Hoboken International Film Festival, Boyland received a Best Supporting Actor nomination for his work on Blood Punch.

References

External links

New Zealand male film actors
New Zealand male television actors
New Zealand male stage actors
Living people
1987 births
New Zealand male voice actors
New Zealand male soap opera actors
People from Lower Hutt
20th-century New Zealand male actors
21st-century New Zealand male actors